Gareth Price (born 26 August 1980) is a Welsh former rugby union and rugby league footballer who played in the 1990s and 2000s.

Background
Gareth Price was born in Swansea, Wales.

Playing career
Price was a revelation with Widnes, in 2007 playing in 18 games, and he has been noted for his ability to break a tackle, whilst Gareth's defence is also highly regarded.

International honours 
Gareth Price won caps for Wales while at St. Helens, Rochdale Hornets, and Celtic Crusaders.

References

External links 
(archived by web.archive.org) Widnes Profile
Profile at saints.org.uk
Profile at saints.org.uk

1980 births
Living people
Crusaders Rugby League players
Footballers who switched code
Hull Kingston Rovers players
Leigh Leopards players
London Broncos players
Neath RFC players
Rochdale Hornets players
Rugby league hookers
Rugby league players from Swansea
Rugby league props
Rugby league second-rows
Rugby union players from Swansea
Salford Red Devils players
St Helens R.F.C. players
Wales national rugby league team players
Welsh rugby league players
Widnes Vikings players